Pa Qaleh (also Romanized as Pā Qal‘eh) is a village in Kakasharaf Rural District, in the Central District of Khorramabad County, Lorestan Province, Iran. At the 2006 census, its population was 119, in 28 families.

References 

Towns and villages in Khorramabad County